Ravni Kotari is a geographical region in Croatia. It lies in northern Dalmatia, around Zadar and east of it. It is bordered by Bukovica to the northeast, lower Krka to the southeast, and the Adriatic Sea. The largest settlement in the region is the town of Benkovac. Other large settlements are Zemunik Donji (where Zadar Airport is located), Polača, Poličnik, Galovac, Raštane donje i gornje, Gorica, Škabrnja, Posedarje, Pridraga, Novigrad, and Stankovci.

See also
Geography of Croatia

External links 
 Some geographical features
 Geological-structural information
 Very good fishing or outdoors adventure location
 Some traditions and food of Ravni Kotari
 Broad habitat of Montagu's harrier

Regions of Croatia
Dalmatia
Geography of Zadar County
Geography of Šibenik-Knin County
Venetian period in the history of Croatia